The following is a list of buildings in Bodie, California. It largely follows the self-guided walking tour in the official guide provided by California State Parks. Some buildings have also been documented by Heritage Documentation Programs of the National Park Service.

References

External links
Brochure with park map

Bodie
Bodie
Historic American Buildings Survey in California
Historic American Engineering Record in California
Bodie
Bodie